Franny Černá (born 22 July 1997) is a Czech professional footballer who plays as a forward for Slavia Prague and the Czech Republic national team.

Early life
Černá was born to Czech parents in Berkeley, California. Her parents migrated to the United States from Czechoslovakia before Velvet Revolution.

Černá attended the DePaul University in Chicago, where she played for the DePaul Blue Demons from 2015 to 2018. She scored 33 goals and provided 16 assists from 77 matches during her college career.

Club career
On 19 February 2019, Czech First Division club Slavia Prague announced the signing of Černá. She made her professional debut on 20 March 2019 in a 1–1 draw against Bayern Munich. She scored her first goal for club on 30 March 2020, netting four times in a 11–0 win against Lokomotiva Brno Horní Heršpice.

International career
Černá began her international career for Czech Republic with under-19 team. She played several matches for the team in qualifying stage of 2014 UEFA Women's Under-19 Championship and 2015 UEFA Women's Under-19 Championship.

Černá made her senior team debut on 5 March 2020 in a 1–1 draw against Finland.

Career statistics

Club

International

Honours
Slavia Prague
 Czech Women's First League: 2019–20, 2021–22
 Czech Women's Cup: 2021–22

References

External links
 

1997 births
Living people
Soccer players from Berkeley, California
Women's association football forwards
Czech women's footballers
Czech Republic women's international footballers
Czech Women's First League players
SK Slavia Praha (women) players
American people of Czech descent